Fourth Five-Year Plan may refer to:
 Fourth five-year plan of Bhutan
 Fourth five-year plan of China
 Fourth five-year plan of India
 Fourth five-year plan of Nepal
 Fourth five-year plan of Pakistan
 Fourth five-year plan of Romania
 Fourth five-year plan of South Korea
 Fourth Five-Year Plan (Soviet Union)
 Fourth five-year plan of Vietnam

See also
Five-year plan
Third Five-Year Plan (disambiguation)
Fifth Five-Year Plan (disambiguation)